Zvjezdan Pejović (born 28 October 1966) is a Montenegrin former professional footballer who played as a defender for several clubs in Yugoslavia and Germany.

Club career
Pejović played for OFK Titograd, FK Budućnost Titograd and Hajduk Split in Yugoslavia (until spring 1993 although he did not play official matches in Croatian league since its inception at the end of 1991), and for VfL Osnabrück, FC Carl Zeiss Jena, Fortuna Düsseldorf and Eintracht Frankfurt in Germany.

References

1966 births
Living people
Footballers from Podgorica
Association football defenders
Yugoslav footballers
Montenegrin footballers
OFK Titograd players
FK Budućnost Podgorica players
HNK Hajduk Split players
VfL Osnabrück players
FC Carl Zeiss Jena players
Fortuna Düsseldorf players
Eintracht Frankfurt players
Yugoslav First League players
2. Bundesliga players
Bundesliga players
Yugoslav expatriate footballers
Yugoslav expatriate sportspeople in Germany
Expatriate footballers in Germany